The Peoples Daily is a newspaper in Nigeria. It was launched as a weekly in November 2008, and it  became a daily in November 2009.

History 
The Peoples Daily was formally presented at a ceremony in Abuja in March 2010.
Chairman of the Board of Directors is Malam Wada Abdullahi Maida. 
At the ceremony, Malam Ismaila Isa made it clear that, despite a circulating rumour, Peoples Daily was not owned by former Vice President Atiku Abubakar. Instead, the company was owned by over 40 media professionals.

In December 2009, agents of the State Security Service arrested the paper's editor, Malam Ahmed Shekarau, apparently due to a report on the health of ailing President Umaru Yar'Adua. Shekarau later left Peoples Daily to join the Daily Trust as General Manager.

References

Daily newspapers published in Nigeria
English-language newspapers published in Africa
Newspapers published in Abuja
2008 establishments in Nigeria
Publications established in 2008